Eyler is a surname. Notable people with the surname include:

 Clement M. Eyler (1897–1979), American football and basketball coach and educator
 John Eyler, author, academic and historian
 Larry Eyler (1952–1994), American serial killer
 Phil Eyler (born 1948), Canadian politician

See also
 Eller (surname)
 Eylar, villege in Iran